Icaricia neurona, the veined blue, is a species of blue in the butterfly family Lycaenidae. It is found in North America.

The MONA or Hodges number for Icaricia neurona is 4382.

References

Icaricia
Articles created by Qbugbot
Butterflies described in 1902